Presario is a discontinued line of consumer desktop computers and notebooks originally produced by Compaq. The Presario family of computers was introduced in September 1993.

In the mid-1990s, Compaq began manufacturing PC monitors as part of the Presario brand. A series of all-in-one units, containing both the PC and the monitor in the same case, were also released.

After Compaq merged with HP in 2002, the Presario line of desktops and laptops were sold concurrently with HP’s other products, such as the HP Pavilion. The Presario laptops subsequently replaced the then-discontinued HP OmniBook line of notebooks around that same year.

The Presario brand name would continue to be used for low-end home desktops and laptops from 2002 until the Compaq brand name was discontinued by HP in 2013.

Desktop PC series

 Compaq Presario 2100
 Compaq Presario 2200
 Compaq Presario 2240
 Compaq Presario 2256
 Compaq Presario 2285V
 Compaq Presario 2286
 Compaq Presario 2288
 Compaq Presario 4108
 Compaq Presario 4110
 Compaq Presario 4160
 Compaq Presario 4505
 Compaq Presario 4508
 Compaq Presario 4528
 Compaq Presario 4532
 Compaq Presario 4540
 Compaq Presario 4600
 Compaq Presario 4620
 Compaq Presario 4712
 Compaq Presario 4800
 Compaq Presario 5000 series
 Compaq Presario 5000
 Compaq Presario 5006US
 Compaq Presario 5008US
 Compaq Presario 5000A
 Compaq Presario 5000T
 Compaq Presario 5000Z
 Compaq Presario 5010
 Compaq Presario 5030
 Compaq Presario 5050
 Compaq Presario 5080
 Compaq Presario 5100 series
 Compaq Presario 5150
 Compaq Presario 5170
 Compaq Presario 5184
 Compaq Presario 5185
 Compaq Presario 5190
 Compaq Presario 5200 series
 Compaq Presario 5202
 Compaq Presario 5222
 Compaq Presario 5240
 Compaq Presario 5280
 Compaq Presario 5285
 Compaq Presario 5360
 Compaq Presario 5400
 Compaq Presario 5460
 Compaq Presario 5477
 Compaq Presario 5500
 Compaq Presario 5520
 Compaq Presario 5599
 Compaq Presario 5600 series
 Compaq Presario 5660
 Compaq Presario 5670
 Compaq Presario 5686
 Compaq Presario 5690
 Compaq Presario 5695
 Compaq Presario 5600i
 Compaq Presario 5700N
 Compaq Presario 5710
 Compaq Presario 5726
 Compaq Presario 5868
 Compaq Presario 5900T
 Compaq Presario 6000 series
 Compaq Presario 6300US
 Compaq Presario 6310US
 Compaq Presario 6320US
 Compaq Presario 7000 series
 Compaq Presario 7000US
 Compaq Presario 7002US
 Compaq Presario 7003US
 Compaq Presario 7006US
 Compaq Presario 7000T
 Compaq Presario 7000Z
 Compaq Presario 7470
 Compaq Presario 7478
 Compaq Presario 7594
 Compaq Presario 7596
 Compaq Presario 7940
 Compaq Presario 8000 series
 Compaq Presario 8017US
 Compaq Presario 8022US
 Compaq Presario 8000T
 Compaq Presario 8000Z
 Compaq Presario 9232
 Compaq Presario 9234
 Compaq Presario 9546
 Compaq Presario CQ3180AN
 Compaq Presario CQ5814
 Compaq Presario EZ2000 series
 Compaq Presario EZ2000
 Compaq Presario EZ2200
 Compaq Presario SG1008IL
 Compaq Presario SG3730IL
 Compaq Presario SR1000 series
SR1000 Series
SR1100 Series
SR1200 Series
SR1300 Series
SR1400 Series
SR1500 Series
SR1600 Series
SR1700 Series
SR1800 Series
SR1900 Series 
 Compaq Presario SR2000 series
 Compaq Presario SR5000 series
 Presario SR5605F
 Presario SR5550F
 Presario SR5710Y
 Presario SR5520AN
 Compaq Presario CDS 724
 Compaq Presario CDS 924
 Compaq Presario CDS 942
 Compaq Presario CDS 972
 Compaq Presario CDS 982

Model number suffixes:
 T: Intel-based processor
 Z: AMD-based processor
 i, N, Y: Built For You/Configure To Order (CTO)
 etc.

Country codes:
 US: United States
 etc.

Notebook series

 Compaq Presario 300
 Compaq Presario 700 
 Compaq Presario 800
 Compaq Presario 900
 Compaq Presario 1000
 Compaq Presario 1200
 Compaq Presario 1400
 Compaq Presario 1500
 Compaq Presario 1600
 Compaq Presario 1700
 Compaq Presario 1800
 Compaq Presario 1900
 Compaq Presario 2100
 Compaq Presario 2200
 Compaq Presario 2500
 Compaq Presario 2700
 Compaq Presario 2800
 Compaq Presario 3000
 Compaq Presario A900
 Compaq Presario C300 
 Compaq Presario C500 
 Compaq Presario C700 
 Compaq Presario CQ20
 Compaq Presario CQ35
 Compaq Presario CQ40
 Compaq Presario CQ41
 Compaq Presario CQ42
 Compaq Presario CQ43
 Compaq Presario CQ45
 Compaq Presario CQ50
 Compaq Presario CQ56
 Compaq Presario CQ57
 Compaq Presario CQ58
 Compaq Presario CQ60
 Compaq Presario CQ61
 Compaq Presario CQ62
 Compaq Presario CQ70
 Compaq Presario CQ71
 Compaq Presario F500
 Compaq Presario F700
 Compaq Presario M2000
 Compaq Presario R3000
 Compaq Presario R4000
 Compaq Presario V1000
 Compaq Presario V2000
 Compaq Presario V3000
 Compaq Presario V3500
 Compaq Presario V4000
 Compaq Presario V5000
 Compaq Presario V6000
 Compaq Presario X1000
 Compaq Presario X6001

All-in-one
These are all-in-one computers containing the PC and monitor in the same unit.

 Compaq Presario 425
 Compaq Presario 433
 Compaq Presario 460
 Compaq Presario 3020
 Compaq Presario 3060
 Compaq Presario 4402
 Compaq Presario 4410
 Compaq Presario 5520
 Compaq Presario 5522
 Compaq Presario 5528
 Compaq Presario 5536
 Compaq Presario CDS 510
 Compaq Presario CDS 520
 Compaq Presario CDS 524
 Compaq Presario CDTV 520
 Compaq Presario CDTV 524
 Compaq Presario CDTV 528

Monitors
Various computer monitors of different display types and sizes have been produced under the Compaq Presario brand since 1996.

1x25 and FXx00 series
The 1X25 monitors were paired with the Compaq Presario 4500, 4600, 4800 and a few other Series 2 designed Presarios, which featured a spaceship or rocket ship design on the front casing of the towers. The towers also had smoked-black CD bezel covers. Other Presarios of this era had different case designs that had a beveled concave shape surrounding the drive bays. These monitors all shared the same design cues from the towers they were meant to match: all of them had a split lower bezel which ran down the middle. The monitors had dials for brightness and contrast, plus a volume dial for speakers, which also acts as a power button when pressed. It also has a mute button for the volume on the left side of the monitor, and featured a few digital controls located behind the bottom panel. The monitor also has a built-in microphone, located on the top of the monitor.

There is also a very rare set of monitors (the FX series) which are all black and had built-in speakers and a subwoofer, plus three extra USB ports. These are designed to go with the 4800 series Presario multimedia towers (specifically the 4830 to 4882), as they were all black just like the FX monitors.

 Compaq Presario 1425
 Compaq Presario 1525
 Compaq Presario 1725
 Compaq Presario 1725b
 Compaq Presario FX500
 Compaq Presario FX700

All of these monitors came with JBL Pro speakers which could be mounted to the sides of the monitors. The FX is the only exception, which had built-in JBL Pro-powered speakers with a subwoofer in the rear of the casing.

MVx00 and FPx00 series
The MVX00 and FPX00 monitors were designed to be sold with the Series 3 designed Compaq towers. They retained the original spaceship design of the second generation Presario towers, except most had smoked-black plastic "easy access" flip-up doors on the bottom containing USB and audio ports behind it, and a slightly squatter design that was more rounded. Like the previous monitors before it, these monitors were designed to match the design cues of the Series 3 Presarios. These monitors had their brightness and contrast dials of the previous monitors removed in favor of digital controls accessible by a button on the monitor. Six LED lights were present on the MV500 monitor which indicated the type of control being used, while the MV700 and MV900 monitors removed the LED lights in favor of on-screen display digital controls. The volume dial (which acted as a power button) and mute buttons were also removed, with a standard power button in place of the volume dial.

Flat panel displays were introduced during this generation of monitors, which featured a flat panel LCD screen. They were one of the first to be offered for a home PC. These monitors were designated with the letters FP.

 Compaq Presario MV500
 Compaq Presario MV700
 Compaq Presario MV900
 Compaq Presario FP500
 Compaq Presario FP700
 Compaq Presario FP5315

As with the previous monitors, they came with JBL Pro speakers which could be mounted to the sides of the monitors (with the exception of the FP series).

MVx20 series
The MVX20 monitors were designed for use with Series 4 designed Presarios. They retained the spaceship form factor of previous generation Presarios but in a more curvature shape, and most of them had translucent purple plastic flip-up doors that provided access to USB and/or FireWire (IEEE 1394) ports. Like previous Presario monitors, these were designed to match with the Series 4 Presarios as they shared the same design cues. The monitors featured on-screen display digital controls instead of six LED lights featured on the MV500 that indicated the type of control being used.

 Compaq Presario MV520
 Compaq Presario MV720
 Compaq Presario MV920

Unlike the 1X25 and MVX00 monitors, these monitors lacked the side mount holes for speakers. Instead, it relied on separate JBL Pro speakers, which were redesigned to match the monitors and towers but are not mountable.

MVx40, CVx35, FSx40, and FPx40 series
The MVX40, CVX35 and FSX40 monitors were used with the Compaq Presario 5000 and 7000 series, as well as some Series 5 designed Presarios. Both the 5000 and 7000 series of towers had a brand new front case design that moved away from the spaceship-derived design of previous generation Presarios in favor of a more sleek and stylish design that featured removable translucent colored plastic faceplates, which were offered in five colors. These monitors were mostly similar in design with the previous MVX20 monitors, but with a refreshed design that featured a more curvature exterior instead of the boxy-styled angular design of previous monitors, fitting in with the design cues of the 5000 and 7000 series. The CVX35 monitors lacked the built-in microphone the MVX40 and FSX40 monitors had.

Flat-screen CRT displays were introduced alongside the MVX40 monitors and are designated with the letters FS. Flat panel LCD displays were also available, designated with the letters FP.

 Compaq Presario MV540
 Compaq Presario MV740
 Compaq Presario MV940
 Compaq Presario CV535
 Compaq Presario CV735
 Compaq Presario CV935
 Compaq Presario FP745A
 Compaq Presario FS740
 Compaq Presario FS940

All of these monitors (except for the FP745A) came with JBL Platinum Series speakers that could be mounted on the sides of the monitors, just like with the 1X25 and MVX00 monitors. The speakers also featured removable colored speaker grills offered in five colors matching with the case design of the 5000 and 7000 series, and has a line-in jack for audio input.

Image gallery

See also

 List of Hewlett-Packard products

References

External links
 Official Compaq website (archived)
 Official Hewlett-Packard website
 Compaq Presario Reviews, CNET
 Compaq Presario Notebook main info page
 User reviews, Compaq Notebooks at Notebookreview.com
 Compaq Presario 8000Z Specifications
 Presario 8000Z Review, PCMag.com

Presario
Presario
Presario
Discontinued products
IBM PC compatibles
All-in-one desktop computers
Computer-related introductions in 1993